Beyond the Aquila Rift  is a 2016 collection of science fiction short stories and novellas by British author Alastair Reynolds, published by Gollancz, and edited by Jonathan Strahan and William Schafer. It contains works previously published in other venues.  The collection features several stories connected to Reynolds's previous stories and novels.  "Great Wall of Mars", "Weather", Last Log of the Lachrymosa, and Diamond Dogs take place in the Revelation Space universe, Thousandth Night takes place in the same universe as House of Suns, and "The Water Thief" takes place in the Poseidon's Children universe.

Stories

Adaptations
On 10 March 2019 Alastair Reynolds announced that his short story "Beyond the Aquila Rift" was adapted as part of Netflix's animated anthology Love, Death & Robots. This story, along with "Zima Blue", are the first of Reynolds' works to be adapted for TV or film.

See also
Revelation Space universe

References

2016 short story collections
Science fiction short story collections
Science fiction anthologies
Victor Gollancz Ltd books
Subterranean Press books